Hallim is a town located in Jeju City, Jeju Province, South Korea.

References

Towns and townships in Jeju Province